This is a list of elections in Canada that were held in 2022. Included are municipal, provincial and federal elections, by-elections on any level, referendums and party leadership races at any level.

Leadership elections 

 February 4: 2022 British Columbia Liberal Party leadership election
 April 23: 2022 New Democratic Party of Prince Edward Island leadership election
 May 14: 2022 Maverick Party leadership election
 June 25: 2022 Nova Scotia New Democratic Party leadership election
 June 26: 2022 Saskatchewan New Democratic Party leadership election
 July 9: 2022 Nova Scotia Liberal Party leadership election
 August 6: 2022 New Brunswick Liberal Association leadership election
 September 10: 2022 Conservative Party of Canada leadership election
 October 6: 2022 United Conservative Party leadership election
 October 21: 2022 British Columbia New Democratic Party leadership election
 November 19:
Prince Edward Island Liberal Party leadership election
Green Party of Canada leadership election

January–February
January 10: 
Municipal by-election in Blackfalds, Alberta
Splatsin First Nation General Election
January 12: Gwa‘sala-‘Nakwaxda‘xw Nations election
January 13: Coldwater Indian Band general election
January 15: Prince George School District and Nanaimo Ladysmith School District by-elections
January 24: Mayoral by-election in Richmond Hill, Ontario
January 28: Webequie Chief election
February 4: Douglas First Nation council election
February 5: Municipal (councillor and mayoral) by-election in Wells, British Columbia
February 6: Wuikinuxv Nation election
February 7: Municipal by-elections in Ward 9, Cypress County, Alberta and Innisfree, Alberta.
February 8: Territorial by-election in Tu Nedhé-Wiilideh, Northwest Territories
February 11: Webequie council election
February 15: 
Provincial by-election in Athabasca, Saskatchewan
Simpcw First Nation council by-election
February 23: 
Tseshaht First Nation council by-election
Squiala First Nation election
February 28: Municipal by-election in Nanton, Alberta

March–June
March 1: Birch Narrows Dene Nation election
March 2: Akisq'nuk First Nation election
March 3: Millbrook First Nation election
March 7: Norway House Cree Nation chief and council election
March 14: 
Municipal by-election in Delburne, Alberta
Municipal by-election in Rockyford, Alberta
March 15: Provincial by-election in Fort McMurray-Lac La Biche, Alberta
March 19: Xaxli‘p Nation Election
March 21: Gitxaala Nation Election
March 22: 
Provincial by-election in Fort Whyte, Manitoba
Municipal by-elections in Clyde and Forestburg, Alberta
Lhtako Dene Nation Election
March 26: Shxwhá:y Village council election
April 2: Tla'amin Nation by-election
April 5: Municipal by-election in Labrador City, Newfoundland and Labrador
April 9: Municipal by-election in Silverton, British Columbia
April 10: Municipal by-election in Sainte-Brigitte-de-Laval, Quebec (mayor and council #4)
April 11: Provincial by-election in Marie-Victorin, Quebec
April 27: Métis Nation British Columbia by-election
April 30: 
Municipal by-election in Lytton, British Columbia 
Provincial by-election in Vancouver-Quilchena, British Columbia
May 8: Municipal by-election in District #14, Saguenay, Quebec
May 15: Municipal by-election in Sainte-Brigitte-de-Laval, councillor #1. 
June 2: 2022 Ontario general election
June 4: 
Nanaimo Regional District Area C by-election (cancelled due to acclamation). 
Municipal special election in District 2, Inverness County, Nova Scotia
June 5: Municipal by-election in des Montagnes District, Shawinigan, Quebec
June 7: Provincial by-election in Thompson, Manitoba
June 8: Municipal by-election Wolseley (cancelled due to acclamation) and Assiniboia, Saskatchewan.
June 11: Mushkegowuk Council by-Election, Chapleau Cree First Nation
June 12: Municipal by-election in district #6 Beloeil, Quebec
June 20: Provincial by-elections in Miramichi Bay-Neguac and Southwest Miramichi-Bay du Vin, New Brunswick
June 30: Municipal by-election in Dawson City, Yukon

July–September
July 2: Municipal by-election in Division No. 1, District of Lakeland No. 521, Saskatchewan
July 10: Municipal by-election in Otter Lake, Quebec for councillor #3.
July 11: Municipal by-election in Clyde, Alberta (cancelled due to acclamation)
July 12: Heiltsuk Nation Tribal Council election
July 17: Municipal by-elections in District #2, Beauceville and in Baie-D'Urfé, Quebec.
July 22: Municipal elections in Duttonar, Victoria Beach and Winnipeg Beach, Manitoba
August 7: Municipal by-election in District #4, Notre-Dame-de-l'Île-Perrot, Quebec
August 10: Chinook School Division, Saskatchewan by-election for Subdivision 1
August 23: Municipal by-election in Viking, Alberta
August 30: Municipal by-election in Bon Accord, Alberta
September 3: Six Nations of the Grand River Elected Council by-election
September 10: Provincial by-election in Surrey South, British Columbia 
September 13: Municipal by-election in Viking, Alberta (acclamation)
September 22: Buffalo Trail Public Schools Regional Division No. 28 Ward 4, Subdivision 3 by-election
September 26: 
Provincial by-election in Saskatoon Meewasin, Saskatchewan
Municipal by-election in Hanna, Alberta (cancelled due to acclamation)

October–December
October 3: 2022 Quebec general election
October 12: Municipal by-election in High Level, Alberta
October 15: 2022 British Columbia municipal elections
October 16: Municipal by-election in Boileau, Quebec
October 17: 
Municipal by-election in Grande Prairie, Alberta.
Municipal election in Yellowknife, Northwest Territories
Municipal by-election in Inuvik, Northwest Territories
October 23: Municipal by-election in Parc-de-la-Montagne-Saint-Raymond District, Gatineau, Quebec
October 24: 
2022 Ontario municipal elections
Municipal by-election in Legal, Alberta
October 26: 2022 Manitoba municipal elections
November 7: 2022 Prince Edward Island municipal elections
November 8: Provincial by-election in Brooks-Medicine Hat, Alberta 
November 9: Saskatchewan municipal elections (even numbered rural municipality divisions)
November 20: Mayoral by-election and Des Patriotes District by-election in Sorel-Tracy, Quebec
November 21
Municipal by-election in Division 4, Lac Ste. Anne County, Alberta.
Municipal by-election in Fox Creek, Alberta (cancelled due to acclamation)
Municipal by-election in Rocky Mountain House, Alberta
November 28: New Brunswick local government elections
December 4: Municipal by-elections in Beauceville (District 3), Beloeil (District 6), Rouyn-Noranda (Université District, cancelled due to acclamation) and Sainte-Julienne, Quebec (mayor)
December 9: Saugeen First Nation #29 By-election
December 11: Municipal by-election in Belle-Rivière - Ringuet District, Sainte-Julie, Quebec
December 12: 
Northwest Territories municipal elections (hamlets)
 2022 Mississauga—Lakeshore federal by-election
December 13: Provincial by-election in Kirkfield Park, Manitoba

See also 

 2022 United Kingdom electoral calendar

References

External links
BC Local by-elections
Quebec municipal by-elections
Government of Canada election calendar

 
Political timelines of the 2020s by year